Baptism of fire is a Christian concept.

Baptism of Fire may also refer to:
Baptism of Fire, a 1943 documentary film starring Elisha Cook Jr.
 Baptism of Fire (novel), a 1996 novel by Polish fantasy writer Andrzej Sapkowski
 Baptism of Fire: The Second Battle of Ypres and the Forging of Canada, April 1915, a 2007 book by Nathan M. Greenfield

See also
Baptizm of Fire, an album by Glenn Tipton
Baptized By Fire (disambiguation)